The Former City Hall of Rogers, Arkansas is located at 202 West Elm Street.  It is a three-story brick Colonial Revival building, designed by architect A. O. Clark and built in 1929.  The building was used by the city for municipal offices and as a fire station until the 1990s. It is now being converted to residential use.

The building was listed on the National Register of Historic Places in 1988 (as "Rogers City Hall").

See also
National Register of Historic Places listings in Benton County, Arkansas

References

City and town halls on the National Register of Historic Places in Arkansas
Colonial Revival architecture in Arkansas
Buildings and structures completed in 1929
Buildings and structures in Rogers, Arkansas
City halls in Arkansas
National Register of Historic Places in Benton County, Arkansas
Historic district contributing properties in Arkansas